In geometry, the great ditrigonal dodecicosidodecahedron (or great dodekified icosidodecahedron) is a nonconvex uniform polyhedron, indexed as U42. It has 44 faces (20 triangles, 12 pentagons, and 12 decagrams), 120 edges, and 60 vertices. Its vertex figure is an isosceles trapezoid.

Related polyhedra 

It shares its vertex arrangement with the truncated dodecahedron. It additionally shares its edge arrangement with the great icosicosidodecahedron (having the triangular and pentagonal faces in common) and the great dodecicosahedron (having the decagrammic faces in common).

See also 
 List of uniform polyhedra

References

External links 
 

Uniform polyhedra